The 1976 United States presidential election in Illinois was held on November 2, 1976. All 50 states and The District of Columbia, were part of the 1976 United States presidential election. State voters chose 26 electors to the Electoral College, who voted for president and vice president. 

In the last two presidential elections, Illinois had voted Republican. In 1972, the state had, like the rest of the nation outside Massachusetts and the District of Columbia, voted strongly for Richard Nixon who carried every county except college-dominated Jackson, although Democrat George McGovern ran 3% above his national vote percentage in the state. This is the last time Illinois voted for a losing Republican.

By the second week of September polls were showing Carter ahead of incumbent President Gerald Ford by 14%, but running much weaker in the emerging “Rust Belt” industrial states – his lead in Illinois would be estimated at four percentage points. A few days later another poll had Ford already ahead in the “Land of Lincoln”, but another poll had the incumbent President narrowly behind.

Defeated Republican primary candidate and future President Ronald Reagan helped Ford in his fall campaign in Illinois, although Carter preceded him in visiting the state – doing so for the first time on September 24. Ford’s running mate Bob Dole followed Carter to the state and said that Carter had “3 positions on every issue” during a tour through Rock Island, Quincy and Decatur. At this time it was also thought that Ford was helped by the strong GOP gubernatorial campaign of James R. Thompson.

At the beginning of October, Illinois was viewed as “too close to call”, before Carter paid a second visit to the state – with the support of Chicago Mayor Richard Daley viewed essential to his chances of carrying the state’s electoral votes due to the coolness of the northern and central parts of the state toward a Southern Evangelical Democrat. Carter would subsequently move ahead, but the state remained very close as election day neared, with South Side black voters considered a critical aspect of Carter’s hopes.

Gerald Ford won Illinois with 50.10 percent of the vote, but lost the general election to Jimmy Carter of Georgia. Illinois’ result was 4% more Republican than the nation at large. 

Ford’s win was due to his large majorities in the traditionally Republican collar counties, chiefly DuPage, which he won by a margin ten thousand votes greater than his statewide total margin. Carter did well in Cook County and Dixie Southern Illinois, but his majorities there were much smaller than New Deal era Democrats had won. This is the last election where a Democrat won the White House without carrying Illinois (one of only three such elections, the others being 1884 and 1916), and also the most recent presidential election when Illinois would vote more Republican than the nation. The state would not vote for a losing candidate again until 2000, and for the loser of the popular vote until 2004.

Primaries
The primaries and general elections coincided with those for congress and those for state offices.

Turnout
Turnout in the primary election was 36.29%, with a total of 2,087,807 votes cast.

Turnout in the general election was 75.47%, with a total of 4,719,304 votes cast. State-run primaries were held for the Democratic and Republican parties on March 16.

Democratic

The 1976 Illinois Democratic presidential primary was held on March 16, 1976 in the U.S. state of Illinois as one of the Democratic Party's statewide nomination contests ahead of the 1976 presidential election.

The popular vote was a "beauty contest". Delegates were instead selected by direct-vote in each congressional districts on delegate candidates, who had either pledged to support a candidate or been uncommitted.

The popular vote of the "beauty contest" saw a plurality won by Jimmy Carter.

While he was not a candidate for the popular vote, in the vote for delegates, a plurality of the state's delegates were awarded to favorite son Adlai Stevenson III, with Georgia Governor Jimmy Carter placing second. Stevenson was used as a stand-in by Richard M. Daley to get otherwise uncommitted delegates elected.

Republican

The 1976 Illinois Republican presidential primary was held on March 16, 1976 in the U.S. state of Illinois as one of the Republican Party's statewide nomination contests ahead of the 1976 presidential election.

The popular vote was a "beauty contest". Delegates were instead selected by direct-vote in each congressional districts on delegate candidates, who had either pledged to support a candidate or been uncommitted.

Results

Results by county

See also
 United States presidential elections in Illinois

References	

1976
Illinois
1976 Illinois elections